Freddy Rojas (born 27 August 1969) is a Cuban former amateur boxer. He competed in the men's light heavyweight event at the 1996 Summer Olympics.

References

External links
 

1969 births
Living people
Cuban male boxers
Olympic boxers of Cuba
Boxers at the 1996 Summer Olympics
Sportspeople from Camagüey
Light-heavyweight boxers